Sorin Paliga (born Viorel-Sorin Paliga on June 21, 1956 in Braniștea, Dâmbovița County, Romania) is a Romanian linguist and politician. He is a university professor at the University of Bucharest. As a politician, he was the former mayor of Sector 3 of Bucharest from June 1996 to June 2000, and was affiliated with the National Liberal Party (PNL).

Research interests
Paliga's main research interests include the influence of Dacian on Romanian, language contact, and Indo-European philology.

Paliga is a proponent of 's  theory, which links the Indo-European, Uralic, and Altaic language families.

Education
Paliga studied Czech and English at the University of Bucharest. He received his doctorate in 1998 by completing his dissertation on Roman and pre-Roman influences in South Slavic languages.

References

External links
Academia.edu page
Google Scholar

Living people
1956 births
People from Dâmbovița County
Linguists from Romania
Academic staff of the University of Bucharest
Romanian philologists
National Liberal Party (Romania) politicians
University of Bucharest alumni
Mayors of the sectors of Bucharest
Long-range comparative linguists